Aldo Emilio Seidler (born 1954), is an Argentine chess player.

Biography
In the 1970s Aldo Emilio Seidler was one of Argentina's leading junior chess players. He twice won Argentine Chess Junior Championships: 1971 and 1973. He twice participated in the Argentine Chess Championship finals (1976, 1978). His best result in this tournaments was 5th place in 1976 He was participant in a number of strong international chess tournaments. Aldo Emilio Seidler twice won Mar del Plata Open Chess Tournament (1976, 1978).

Aldo Emilio Seidler played for Argentina B team in the Chess Olympiad:
 In 1978, at second board in the 23rd Chess Olympiad in Buenos Aires (+6, =3, -3).

References

External links

Aldo Emilio Seidler chess games at 365chess.com

1954 births
Living people
Argentine chess players
Chess Olympiad competitors
20th-century chess players